The 2003 Vuelta a Murcia was the 19th professional edition of the Vuelta a Murcia cycle race and was held on 5 March to 9 March 2003. The race started and finished in Murcia. The race was won by Javier Pascual Llorente.

General classification

References

2003
Vuelta a Murcia